Trichloroacetic acid (TCA; TCAA; also known as trichloroethanoic acid) is an analogue of acetic acid in which the three hydrogen atoms of the methyl group have all been replaced by chlorine atoms. Salts and esters of trichloroacetic acid are called trichloroacetates.

Synthesis
It is prepared by the reaction of chlorine with acetic acid in the presence of a suitable catalyst such as red phosphorus. This reaction is Hell–Volhard–Zelinsky halogenation.
 + 3  →  + 3 
Another route to trichloroacetic acid is the oxidation of trichloroacetaldehyde.

Use
It is widely used in biochemistry for the precipitation of macromolecules, such as proteins, DNA, and RNA. TCA and DCA are both used in cosmetic treatments (such as chemical peels and tattoo removal) and as topical medication for chemoablation of warts, including genital warts. It can kill normal cells as well. It is considered safe for use for this purpose during pregnancy.
The sodium salt (sodium trichloroacetate) was used as an herbicide starting in the 1950s but regulators removed it from the market in the late 1980s and early 1990s.

Environmental and health concerns
According to the European Chemicals Agency, "This substance causes severe skin burns and eye damage, is very toxic to aquatic life and has long lasting toxic effects."

Trichloroacetic acid was placed on the California Proposition 65 List in 2013 "as a chemical known to the state to cause cancer".

History
The discovery of trichloroacetic acid by Jean-Baptiste Dumas in 1839 delivered a striking example to the slowly evolving theory of organic radicals and valences. The theory was contrary to the beliefs of Jöns Jakob Berzelius, starting a long dispute between Dumas and Berzelius.

Popular Culture
In the 1958 film, The Blob, a bottle of trichloroacetic acid is tossed at the Blob in a futile attempt to fend it off.

See also
Chloroacetic acids

References

External links

CDC - NIOSH Pocket Guide to Chemical Hazards

Acetic acids
IARC Group 2B carcinogens
Trichloromethyl compounds
Organic compounds with 2 carbon atoms